Willow Island (also Willow) is an unincorporated community and census-designated place in western Dawson County, Nebraska, United States. As of the 2010 census it had a population of 26.

Willow Island lies near Interstate 80 along U.S. Route 30, between the cities of Cozad and Gothenburg.

Demographics

History
Willow Island was laid out in the 1880s. It was named after a nearby island where willows were abundant.  Because the community had two different names (Willow and Willow Island), the Board on Geographic Names ruled in 1902 that the community's official name was "Willow Island." A post office was established at Willow Island in 1874, and remained in operation until it was discontinued in 1991.

References

Census-designated places in Dawson County, Nebraska
Census-designated places in Nebraska